Chlorolestes tessellatus, the forest malachite or mosaic sylph is a species of damselfly in the family Synlestidae. It is endemic to South Africa.  This shade-loving species is found at seeps and streams in forests and wooded valleys.

It is 47–57 mm long with a wingspan of 55–72 mm. Males and females are similar; the thorax and abdomen are metallic-green aging to coppery brown. The thorax has contrasting yellow antehumeral stripes; these are more broad than those of the similar Mountain Malachite.

References

External links

 Chlorolestes tessellatus on African Dragonflies and Damselflies Online

Odonata of Africa
Insects of South Africa
Synlestidae
Insects described in 1839